The Diary of a Madman Tour was the second concert tour by English heavy metal vocalist Ozzy Osbourne. It was undertaken in support of Osbourne's second album Diary of a Madman and covered Europe, North America, and Asia. This was Rhoads's last tour as he died in a plane crash at a small airport in Leesburg, Florida, on March 19, 1982, during the first leg of the tour. The band took a two-week break after his death. Ozzy and Sharon Osbourne restarted the tour with ex-Gillan guitarist Bernie Tormé, who only performed a couple of shows before being replaced by future Night Ranger guitarist, Brad Gillis.

Overview

Background
After the Blizzard of Ozz Tour, the band took a one-month break before going to Europe to start the tour supporting the upcoming album, Diary of a Madman, scheduled for worldwide release on November 7, 1981. Osbourne, Rhoads, Rudy Sarzo, Tommy Aldridge, and Lindsay Bridgwater reconvened at Shepperton Studios in England, where they would spend the next two weeks rehearsing.

European leg
On November 4, 1981, the band arrived in Hamburg, West Germany to start the tour, opening up for Saxon in Europe. The band's first show was at Ernst-Merck-Halle in front of a sold-out crowd. On November 7, Diary of a Madman was released worldwide and "Flying High Again", "Over the Mountain", "You Can't Kill Rock and Roll" and "Diary of a Madman" were released as singles. On November 13, after the band's performance at Upper Swabia Hall in Ravensburg, Sharon called off the rest of the European leg because of Osbourne's mental health issues resulting from his marriage to Thelma Osbourne having fallen apart. Sharon took Osbourne back to England and checked him into a mental health clinic while the rest of the band went on excursions through West Germany and France before returning to England.

On November 22, the rest of the band reconvened at Shepperton Studios to begin pre-production rehearsals for the United Kingdom dates while Osbourne was in hospital. The band rehearsed songs from Blizzard of Ozz, and the three Black Sabbath songs they had already been performing, "Over the Mountain," "Flying High Again" and "Believer" from Diary of a Madman. On November 29, with opening act Girl, the band performed at Colston Hall in Bristol. On December 2, the band performed its last show of the leg at the Royal Court Theatre in Liverpool. The rest of the European leg was canceled because of Osbourne's depression.

North American leg (December 1981–March 19, 1982)
After returning to Los Angeles on December 5, the band took a break for a couple of weeks and then began pre-production rehearsals. Lindsay Bridgwater departed at this time and Don Airey, former keyboardist of Rainbow was hired. In December, Entertainment Tonight taped some video footage of the band's rehearsals for a segment on the new show. On December 30, the band performed at the Cow Palace in Daly City, California. Rhoads received the Best New Talent Award from Guitar Player. The band returned to Los Angeles for their last show at the Los Angeles Memorial Sports Arena. English hard rock and heavy metal band UFO and Starfighters were added to the bill as the opening bands. On January 7, the band played at Tingley Coliseum in Albuquerque. The local news filmed the first part of the show where the band performed "Over the Mountain" and "Mr. Crowley".

On January 20, at the Des Moines Veterans Memorial Auditorium a fan threw a dead bat, (stolen from the science department of Lincoln, a local high school), onto the stage. Osbourne, believing it to be a toy, took the bat, held out its wings and bit it on a wing then threw it back into the audience. This resulted in him being checked into Des Moines General Hospital to receive rabies shots after the show. On January 24 at Rosemont Horizon in Rosemont, Illinois, Osbourne lifted Rhoads up by his right leg during "Mr. Crowley". A professional photographer captured the moment and the image was used as the cover art for the live album, Tribute. As the band played "Over the Mountain" at the Assembly Hall on their January 26 show, Osbourne collapsed during the middle of the song, and was pulled off stage by Sharon Osbourne and the rest of stage crew, while the band finished instrumentally. He was rushed to the hospital and the remainder of the show was cancelled. Osbourne was given two days to rest and heal from his illness caused by the rabies shots. The band went on to Chicago.

Before the band's performance at Civic Arena on February 2, Rhoads did a guitar seminar at the Music City Record Store in Greensburg, Pennsylvania. On February 11, after playing at the Market Square Arena in Indianapolis, tensions between Osbourne and Rhoads grew as Rhoads did not want to play on a live record consisting of Black Sabbath songs as he felt it would be a major step backward in his career. The record company forced Ozzy and Sharon  to release the album. The band performed at Fair Park Coliseum in Beaumont, Texas on February 16, where the soundcheck rehearsal that took place earlier that day was captured on video. On February 19, Sharon hid all of Ozzy's clothes so that he could not go out and drink anymore. Ozzy put on Sharon's nightgown, got drunk, urinated on The Alamo and was arrested. He was released hours before the show after Sharon warned the police that the concert promoters were worried that not releasing Osbourne from jail would result in the cancellation of that evening's performance and possibly incite a riot. After Osbourne was released, the band performed at the San Antonio Convention Center Arena. Osbourne became "Public Enemy #1" in Texas and received death threats from parents, religious groups and political activists. On February 20, before that evening's performance at Reunion Arena, Rhoads agreed to play on the live album, one more studio album, and to tour with Osbourne. He would then leave to study classical guitar at the University of California, Los Angeles. The band performed in front of a sold-out crowd at Knoxville Civic Coliseum on March 18.

The band were on the tour bus, which was supposed to be heading to Orlando, Florida, for the Rock Super Bowl at the Tangerine Bowl on March 20, but a mechanical problem forced it into a depot called Flying Baron Estates, outside Leesburg, Florida for repairs. Ozzy and Sharon Osbourne (then Sharon Arden), Rudy Sarzo, and Tommy Aldridge were all asleep on the bus while Randy Rhoads, Don Airey, tour manager Jake Duncan, the band's wardrobe/makeup artist Rachel Youngblood, bus driver Andrew Aycock and his wife Wanda, and the rest of the crew were awake. On the property, there was an airstrip and a hangar full of small airplanes. Aycock, who claimed to be an experienced pilot, took a Beechcraft Bonanza F35 plane out of the hangar and offered to take people up in the air. During one of the flights with Aycock, Rhoads, and Youngblood, the left wing struck the bus causing the plane to crash, instantly killing all three. Once the investigation was over on March 21, the band returned to Los Angeles, where they spent the next two weeks trying to recuperate from the tragedy while attempting to find another guitarist.

North American leg (1982)
The band, and especially Osbourne, was in a severe state of depression. Ozzy's drug and alcohol addiction and mental state had worsened. On the day of Rhoads's death, Osbourne had said that it was over and that he never wanted to play again. Sharon got Ozzy back on his feet to finish the tour for his fans. Osbourne had said: "You Can't Kill Rock 'N' Roll," when he was interviewed on Late Night with David Letterman a week after Rhoads's death. Rudy Sarzo called his younger brother, future-Hurricane lead-guitarist, Robert and asked him to audition and play the material the same way as Randy; he was hired. Another guitarist showed up to audition, former-Gillan guitarist, Bernie Tormé. He had been hired and given an advance by Sharon's father, Don Arden, and even though his audition did not go smoothly because he was unfamiliar with the material, and his playing style and feel was different from Rhoads, Tormé ended up getting the job instead of Sarzo.

On March 28, the band flew to Bethlehem, Pennsylvania for three days of rehearsals to restart the tour. On April 1, the band restarted the tour at Stabler Arena in Bethlehem. UFO was back as an opening act in Bethlehem, and Magnum was added during the following five-show stint at Philadelphia's Spectrum. After the Philadelphia shows with Tormé, who was eager to start his solo career, Sharon found future-Night Ranger guitarist, Brad Gillis. He did not feel ready to play onstage yet as he needed some time to learn the setlist. Tormé did several more shows with the band until Gillis was ready. On April 13, he played with the band for the first time at Broome County Veterans Memorial Arena in Binghamton, New York. The band finished the tour with Gillis and Tormé left to start his solo career.

After the band's performance at Glens Falls Civic Arena in New York on May 10, Sharon put the tour on hold again as Osbourne's depression, mental illness, and drug and alcohol addiction had grown worse. The rest of the tour's shows were postponed. The band restarted the tour on May 19 at Cape Cod Coliseum in South Yarmouth, Massachusetts with Magnum as the opening band for the East Coast and Midwest shows, and the Canadian band, Santers, opening for the Canadian dates. Axe was the opening band for the West Coast shows. On June 19, the band performed its first laser show at Oakland Arena in California. The band performed at Irvine Meadows on June 25, where the live pro-video footage was used for Speak of the Devil Live, which was broadcast on MTV on Halloween.

On July 4, Ozzy and Sharon got married. From July 9 to 15, the band performed several shows in Japan. Later on August 6, the day before the band's show at the Rock N Roll Super Bowl (1982) at The Cotton Bowl in Dallas where Le Roux was opening and the supporting acts were Loverboy and Foreigner, Osbourne's depression had grown even worse, and not wanting to do more shows, he shaved his head completely. This did not stop Sharon from forcing him to get on stage wearing a wig. Osbourne ripped the wig off his head and threw it into the audience.

Personnel

European line-up
 Ozzy Osbourne — vocals
 Randy Rhoads — guitar
 Rudy Sarzo — bass
 Tommy Aldridge  — drums
 Lindsay Bridgewater — keyboards

North America line-up
 Ozzy Osbourne — vocals
 Randy Rhoads — guitar
 Rudy Sarzo — bass
 Tommy Aldridge — drums
 Don Airey — keyboards

North America line-up
 Ozzy Osbourne — vocals
 Bernie Tormé — guitar
 Rudy Sarzo — bass
 Tommy Aldridge — drums
 Don Airey — keyboards

Speak of the Devil line-up
 Ozzy Osbourne — vocals
 Brad Gillis — guitar
 Rudy Sarzo — bass
 Tommy Aldridge — drums
 Don Airey — keyboards

Setlists

Europe setlist
"Diary of a Madman" (Intro/Outro) [Audio introduction]
 "Over the Mountain"
 "Flying High Again"
 "Believer"
 "Crazy Train"
 "Mr. Crowley"
 "I Don't Know"
 "Revelation Mother Earth"
 "Suicide Solution"
 Randy Rhoads guitar solo and "The Man on the Flying Trapeze" (Instrumental band jam)
 Tommy Aldridge drum solo and "The Man on the Flying Trapeze" (Instrumental band jam) [Reprise]
 "Paranoid" (Black Sabbath cover)
 "Steal Away the Night" [Encore]

Main setlist
"Diary of a Madman" (Intro/Outro) [Audio Introduction]
 "Over the Mountain"
 "Mr. Crowley"
 "Crazy Train"
 "Revelation Mother Earth"
 "Steal Away the Night"
 "Suicide Solution"
 Randy Rhoads/Bernie Tormé/Brad Gillis Guitar Solo and "The Man on the Flying Trapeze" (Instrumental band jam)
 Tommy Aldridge drum solo and "The Man on the Flying Trapeze" (Instrumental band jam) [Reprise]
 "Goodbye to Romance"
 "I Don't Know"
 "No Bone Movies"
 "Believer"
 "Flying High Again"
 "Iron Man" (Black Sabbath Song)
 "Children of the Grave" (Black Sabbath Song)
 "Paranoid" (Black Sabbath Song) [Encore]

Tour dates

References

Ozzy Osbourne concert tours
1981 concert tours
1982 concert tours